The Meath Echo is a newspaper that was created in 2004 when three local papers in County Meath joined forces: The Ratoath News, The Local Echo, and The Ashbourne And District Eagle.

Speaking to Sunday Business Post, the editor of Irish Village Papers Joe Doyle said: The merging of the three titles will enable us to produce our very popular newspapers more often. Like larger national newspapers, The Meath Echo will only concentrate on local issues and local sports.

Content 

Local News for Ashbourne, Ratoath, Navan, Kells, Trim, Slane, Dunboyne and more
Sports News for Meath
Things to do in County Meath
Advertisement for local shops
Recruitment for County Meath
Property Section
What's new in Motors
Weekly polls on Current Topics

The Meath Echo Entertainment Section contained:
Free Event Listing for County Meath
Cinema movie reviews
Latest DVD reviews
Retro review competition - review of an all-time classic film e.g. Buffalo 66, The Big Lebowski - Submitted by readers
Competitions

See also

 Ashbourne, County Meath
 Ratoath
 Dunboyne

References

Newspapers published in the Republic of Ireland
Mass media in County Meath
Newspapers established in 2004
Publications disestablished in 2011